The 1986 Fajr International Cup was a friendly football tournament that took place in Tehran, Iran. Opening game was played on February 13, 1986, two days after Iranian Revolution Day which is a national public holiday and the final was played on February 21, 1986.

Participant teams

The tournament's participants were from three confederations:

Squads

Iran

Head coach:  Fereydoun Asgarzadeh

Iran B

Head coach:  Nasser Ebrahimi

Khuzestan XI

Head coach:  Haj Rahim Safarian

Pakistan

Head coach:  Major Mohammad Younus Changazi

Al-Fotuwa SC

Head coach:  Anwar Abdelkader

Ghana

Head coach:  Anthony Edusei

Romania XI

Head coach:  Gheorghe Staicu

*Retired Romania national team goalkeeper Necula Raducanu who is assistant coach of the team was an unused sub in the group stage match versus Ghana.

Poland U21

Head coach:  Edmund Zientara

Bold indicates overage players for U21 teams.

Venues

Referees

  Mehdi Abarnirooei
  Mohammad Abarnirooei
  Jamshid Akhbari
  Ali Arbabi (Mashhad FA)
  Mostafa Bahrami
  Bahman Behlouli
  Hossein Dashtgerd (Tehran FA)
  Hadi Dezfouli
  Mohammad Reza Emami
  Fereydoun Karamati(Anzali FA)
  Hamid Khoshkhan(Tehran FA)
  Ali Mohammad Lajmiri(Khuzestan FA)
  Mohammadi(Bushehr FA)
  Manouchehr Nazari(Tehran FA)
  Jamshid Nikmehr
  Mohammad Riahi
  Mohammad Salehi(Tehran FA)
  Hossein Tehrani(Tehran FA)
  Mohammad Yusuf

Group stage

Group 1

Group 2

Knock-out stage

Semifinals

Third place match

Final

Champion

Statistics

Goalscorers

References

1986
1985–86 in Iranian football
1985–86 in Polish football
1985–86 in Romanian football
1986 in Asian football
1986 in African football